Dream Street Rose is Canadian singer Gordon Lightfoot's 14th original album released in 1980 on the Warner Brothers Records label (#3426). The album peaked at #58 on the country chart and at #60 on the pop chart.

The album continues in the style of Summertime Dream (1976) and Endless Wire (1978), with a mix of faster-paced, country-style songs, and introspective folk ballads. Lightfoot's penchant for seafaring songs was again evident with three songs featuring an ocean theme.

The album also featured a recorded version of "The Auctioneer" which had been a concert staple for Lightfoot, although it seemed somewhat out of place when compared to the rest of the album's material.

It was also the last album that would see Lightfoot collaborate with long-time producer Lenny Waronker.

It was one of the first albums recorded digitally.

"Dream Street Rose" reached #80 on the country singles chart.

Track listing
All composition by Gordon Lightfoot; except as indicated
"Sea of Tranquility" – 3:17
"Ghosts of Cape Horn" – 4:09
"Dream Street Rose" – 2:58
"On the High Seas" – 3:18
"Whisper My Name" – 3:12
"If You Need Me" – 2:50
"Hey You" – 2:53
"Make Way for the Lady" – 3:43
"Mister Rock of Ages" – 3:33
"The Auctioneer" (Leroy Van Dyke, Buddy Black) – 3:51

Personnel
 Gordon Lightfoot - vocals, guitar
 Terry Clements - lead guitar
 Rick Haynes - bass
 Pee Wee Charles - pedal steel guitar
 Barry Keane - drums and percussion
 Michael Omartian - piano, keyboards

Chart performance

References

External links
Album lyrics and chords

1980 albums
Gordon Lightfoot albums
Albums produced by Lenny Waronker
Albums produced by Russ Titelman
Reprise Records albums